Dave Ross (1917-1998) was an Australian rugby league footballer who played in the 1930s and 1940s.

Playing career
Ross came to the St. George Dragons via the Arncliffe juniors and was graded in 1937. Ross played in the victorious St. George Reserve Grade grand final team of 1938, scoring a try in the match. 

Ross went on to play 99 games for the Saints in all grades although World War II disrupted his career. Due to residential army rules in 1942, Ross was forced to play a few games with South Sydney Rabbitohs during 1942 and later, he starred in many Army Rugby League teams during 1943–1944. He returned to St. George in 1945 where he finished his long career.

Death
Ross died on 25 April 1998 in Kingsgrove, New South Wales.

References

1917 births
1998 deaths
Australian rugby league players
Rugby league wingers
St. George Dragons players
South Sydney Rabbitohs players